Skippy Dies is a 2010 tragicomic novel by Paul Murray. It was shortlisted for the 2010 Costa Book Awards, longlisted for the 2010 Booker Prize, and was a finalist for the National Book Critics Circle Award.

Plot
Skippy Dies follows the lives of a group of students and faculty members at the fictional Seabrook College, a Catholic boarding school in Dublin. The title character, Daniel "Skippy" Juster, dies during a donut-eating contest in the novel's opening scene. The rest of the novel explores the events leading up to Skippy's death, as well as the aftermath within the Seabrook community.

Development
The novel began as a short story, concerning a pupil and a teacher, but it quickly outgrew this as Murray created further characters. A later draft of the novel ran to a thousand pages, though Murray culled much of this before publication. The Seabrook College of the book is based on Blackrock College, Murray's old secondary school.

Reception
Skippy Dies received almost universally positive reviews, with most reviewers commenting on the mixture of comic and tragic writing and the novel's large scope. The book was included in Time'''s list of the ten best books of 2010, ranked at number three. British Prime Minister David Cameron was reported to be reading the book during his 2011 summer holidays in Spain. The book was also nominated for the 2010 Bollinger Everyman Wodehouse Prize for Comic Fiction and for the 2010 Irish Book Awards Irish Novel of the Year. In 2011, it was nominated for the 2012 International Dublin Literary Award.

Selected reviews
Patrick Ness. "Skippy Dies by Paul Murray". The Guardian. February 6, 2010. Retrieved on May 5, 2011.
Dan Kois. "Ghost, Come Back Again". New York Times''. September 3, 2010. Retrieved on May 5, 2011.
Michael Schaub. "'Skippy Dies in Dublin': A Funny Flashback Follows". NPR. September 8, 2010. Retrieved on May 5, 2011.

References

2010 Irish novels
Novels set in boarding schools
Novels set in Dublin (city)
Hamish Hamilton books
Irish comedy novels